Ocellusia is a genus of flies belonging to the family Lesser Dung flies.

Species
O. achroma Séguy, 1955
O. jugorum Séguy, 1955

References

Sphaeroceridae
Diptera of Africa
Brachycera genera